Beaufield, previously known as Ednaburg, is an unincorporated community in Oakdale Rural Municipality No. 320, Saskatchewan, Canada. Located at Section 18, Township 32, Range 22, West of the 3rd Meridian. It had its first post office named Ednaburg from 1908-05-01 to 1913-08-01 upon which date it changed name to Beaufield. Ednaburg was located at Section 16, Township 32, Range 22, West of the 3rd Meridian. about 2 km east of Highway 21.

See also 
 List of communities in Saskatchewan

References 

Ghost towns in Saskatchewan
Oakdale No. 320, Saskatchewan
Unincorporated communities in Saskatchewan
Division No. 13, Saskatchewan